Dunkel, or Dunkles, is a word used for several types of dark German lager. Dunkel is the German word meaning "dark", and dunkel beers typically range in color from amber to dark reddish brown. They are characterized by their smooth, malty flavor. In informal terms, such as when ordering at a bar, "dunkel" is likely to mean whatever dark beer the bar has on tap, or sells most of; in much of north and western Germany, especially near Düsseldorf, this may be Altbier.

In Bavaria, dunkel, along with helles, is a traditional style brewed in Munich and popular throughout Bavaria. With alcohol concentrations of 4.5% to 6.0% by volume, dunkels are weaker than doppelbocks, another traditional dark Bavarian beer. Dunkels are produced using Munich malts, which give the dunkel its color. Other malts or flavors may also be added.

Many dunkels have a distinctive malty flavor that comes from a special brewing technique called decoction mashing. Most commonly, dunkel beers are dark lagers, but the term is also used to refer to dark wheat beers such as Franziskaner Hefe-Weisse Dunkel. Dunkel weizen is another term used to refer to dark wheat beers, which are fruity and sweet with more dark, roasted malts than their lighter counterpart, the hefeweizen.

Munich dunkel
Dunkels were the original style of the Bavarian villages and countryside, and it was the most common style at the time of the introduction of the Reinheitsgebot (1516). As such, it is the first "fully codified and regulated" beer. Its ABV is rarely higher than 5.5%, and it has low bitterness, a distinctive dark color, and a malty flavor. Dunkel is brewed using lager yeasts.

Lighter-colored lagers were not common until the later part of the 19th century when technological advances made them easier to produce.

Franconian dunkel
Dunkel is also widespread in parts of Franconia, for example the Franconian Switzerland, where it has been originally the most common beer type. The region has a lot of microbreweries, of which many still produce Dunkel. One Example is Weissenohe Abbey Brewery (Weissenoher Klosterbrauerei).

Examples
 Aktienbrauerei Kaufbeuren Dunkel
 Andechser Dunkel
 Augustiner Dunkel
 Ayinger Altbairisch Dunkel
 Dunkel Fester A dunkel-style beer brewed in the UK by the Wychwood Brewery
 Erdinger Dunkel
 Franconia Brewing Company German Dunkel
 Hacker-Pschorr Münchner Dunkel
 Hofbräu München Dunkel
 König Ludwig Dunkel
 Löwenbräu Dunkel
 Paulaner Original Münchner Dunkel
 Spaten München Dunkel
 Warsteiner Premium Dunkel
 Weihenstephaner Tradition Bayrisch Dunkel
 Weltenburg Abbey Weltenburger Kloster Barock Dunkel

See also
 Doppelbock
 German beer
 Helles
 Schwarzbier

References

External links
 Munich Dunkel – by K. Florian Klemp – All About Beer Magazine (Volume 23 Number 5 – November 2002)

German beer styles